Anacampsis sacramenta is a moth of the family Gelechiidae. It was described by Keifer in 1933. It is found in North America, where it has been recorded from California.

References

Moths described in 1933
Anacampsis
Moths of North America